IAWM can refer to:

 International Alliance for Women in Music
 International Association of Women's Museums
 Irish Anti-War Movement